Honeymoon in Bali is a 1939 American romantic comedy film. It is also known by the alternative titles Husbands or Lovers and My Love for Yours. Virginia Van Upp's screenplay was based on the short stories "Our Miss Keane" by Grace Sartwell Mason in The Saturday Evening Post of May 24, 1923, and "Free Woman" by Katharine Brush in Redbook magazine of November–December 1936. In 1936 Paramount announced a film of Our Miss Keane to star Merle Oberon to be produced.

Plot
On a rainy April afternoon in New York City, the head of a major department store, Gail Allen, meets her second cousin and best friend Lorna for afternoon tea. Her cousin, an author of love stories set in the South Seas, invites a resident fortune teller to predict Gail's future. At first the reading sounds like a hundred others, until she foresees her having a child and meeting a man whose arm was cut by a native's rice knife.

The fortune teller predicts, as Neptune is in her sign at the moment, she could find herself walking down a street and taking an unexpected turn where things would change. Thinking that her career will come first, Gail does not like her predicted future but finds herself taking an unexpected turn that takes her into a shop that sells sailboats. There she meets Bill Burnett, who lives in Bali, and is holidaying in New York. Beginning with Bill's injury from a native's rice knife, all of the predictions eventually come to pass.

Burnett has adopted a little girl, Rosie(Carolyn Lee) who Carroll takes an immediate liking to, if not her father.

She also receives much unsolicited advice from a philosophical window washer (Akim Tamiroff), who always ends his shift by climbing into Carroll's office uninvited.

Cast
 Fred MacMurray as Bill "Willie" Burnett
 Madeleine Carroll as Gail Allen
 Allan Jones as Eric Sinclair
 Akim Tamiroff as Tony, the window washer
 Helen Broderick as Lorna "Smitty" Smith
 Osa Massen as Noel Van Ness
 Carolyn Lee as Rosie
 Astrid Allwyn as Fortune Teller
 Georgia Caine as Miss Stone, Gail's secretary
 John Qualen as Meek Man
 Fritzi Brunette as Secretary
 William B. Davidson as Store Detective
 Benny Bartlett as Jack, the singing telegram boy
 Charles Lane as Photographer (uncredited)
 Monty Woolley as Parker, Lorna's publisher (uncredited)

Reception
A review from The Washington Post, on October 5, 1939, says "'Honeymoon in Bali' Is Delightfully Easy To Take!"  The Los Angeles Times review from October 13, 1939, says "'Honeymoon in Bali' Light, Romantic Comedy."

Alternate names
 Are Husbands Necessary? (working title; later used by Paramount for an unrelated 1942 comedy with Ray Milland and Betty Field)
 Husbands or Lovers (UK)
 My Love for Yours (video title)

Quotes
"There's not a wall between freedom and loneliness, you can fall into it without warning" - Lorna

References

External links
 
 
 
 Los Angeles Times Review
 Washington Post Review

1939 films
1930s English-language films
Paramount Pictures films
1939 romantic comedy films
Films based on short fiction
Films set in New York City
Films set in Indonesia
Films directed by Edward H. Griffith
American black-and-white films
Films based on multiple works
American romantic comedy films
1930s American films